Claude II de l’Aubespine, seigneur de Hauterive et de la Forêt-Thaumieres, baron of Châteauneuf-sur-Loire. (1510 – 11 November 1567) was a French diplomat, and Secretary of State.

Life
From 1537 until 1567 he was one of the four Secretaries of State (ministers managing the government). He was one of the plenipotentiary of France to the Treaty of Cateau-Cambrésis, ending the Italian War of 1551–1559.

He served as secretary of state to kings Francis I, Henry II, Francis II and Charles IX.

He was associated with the Assembly of Notables at Fontainebleau, where he produced an edict of tolerance for reforms (1560) and the "reddition de Bourges" (1562).

Sources

French Foreign Ministers
1567 deaths
1510 births
16th-century French diplomats
French Naval Ministers
Court of Henry II of France